Usage-centered design is an approach to user interface design based on a focus on user intentions and usage patterns. It analyzes users in terms of the roles they play in relation to systems and employs abstract (essential) use cases for task analysis. It derives visual and interaction design from abstract prototypes based on the understanding of user roles and task cases.

Usage-centered design was introduced by Larry Constantine and Lucy Lockwood. The primary reference is their book.

Usage-centered design methods
Usage-centered design is largely based on formal, abstract models such as models of interaction between user roles, UML workflow models and task case and role profiles.
Usage-centered design proponents argue for abstract modelling while many designers use realistic personas, scenarios and high-fidelity prototypes. The techniques have been applied with particular success in complex software projects, some of which have been reported in case studies.

Usage-centered design and activity-centered design approach
Usage-centered design share some common ideas with activity-centered design. It is concerned more with the activities of users but not the users per se. Constantine (2006) presents an integrated framework where the models of Usage-centered design are enriched with concepts from the Activity theory.

References

Citations

Bibliography 
Constantine L. Activity Modeling: Toward a Pragmatic Integration of Activity Theory with Usage-Centered Design, 2006
Constantine L., and Lockwood, L. "Structure and Style in Use Cases for User Interfaces." In M. van Harmelan, Ed., Object Modeling and User Interface Design. Boston: Addison-Wesley, 2001.
Constantine L., and Lockwood, L. Software for Use: A Practical Guide to the Essential Models and Methods of Usage-Centered Design. Reading, MA: Addison-Wesley, 1999. (Russian translation 2004, Chinese translation 2004, Japanese translation 2005.)
Constantine, L. “Usage-Centered Software Engineering: New Models, Methods, and Metrics.” In Purvis, M. (ed.) Software Engineering: Education & Practice. Los Alamitos, CA: IEEE Computer Society Press, 1996.
Constantine, L. "Essential Modeling: Use Cases for User Interfaces.” ACM Interactions, 2 (2): 34-46, April 1995.
Strope, J. (2003) “Designing for Breakthroughs in User Performance.” In L. Constantine, ed., Performance by Design: Proceedings of forUSE 2003, the Second International Conference on Usage-Centered Design. Rowley, MA: Ampersand Press.
Windl, H. (2002) “Designing a Winner: Creating STEP 7 lite with Usage-Centered Design.” In L. Constantine, ed., forUSE 2002: Proceedings of the First International Conference on Usage-Centered Design. Rowley, MA: Ampersand Press.

Further reading
Usage-centered design FAQ

User interfaces
Usability
Human–computer interaction